Princess Charlotte of Monaco  (Charlotte Thérèse Nathalie Grimaldi; 19 March 1719 – 1790) was a Monegasque princess and Catholic nun.

Biography 
Princess Charlotte was born on 19 March 1719 at the Hôtel Matignon in Paris to Jacques I, Prince of Monaco and Louise Hippolyte, Princess of Monaco. In 1724, Charlotte was engaged to Frédéric Jules de La Tour d'Auvergne (The Prince d’Auvergne), however the engagement was broken off and she never got married.

In 1733, Pierre Gobert made her portrait.

On 21 January 1738 she took religious vows and became a nun at the Convent of the Visitation. A number of times Charlotte left the convent to visit her family.
  
Charlotte received the veil from the hands of the old Archbishop de Besançon.

She died in 1790.

References 

1719 births
1790 deaths
18th-century French nuns
House of Grimaldi
Monegasque princesses
Monegasque Roman Catholics
Daughters of monarchs